Hasan Kandi Rud (also Romanized as Ḩasan Kandī Rūd; also known as Ḩasan Kandī Hashtrūd and Ḩasan Kandī) is a village in Aliabad Rural District, in the Central District of Hashtrud County, East Azerbaijan Province, Iran. At the 2006 census, its population was 883, in 220 families.

References 

Towns and villages in Hashtrud County